Gurha Salim Airport  is situated 13 km (8 mi) from the city centre of Jhelum, Pakistan. It is not being used by any commercial airlines, but only for military purposes.

See also 
 Jhelum Cantonment
 List of airports in Pakistan
 Transport in Pakistan
 Pakistan Civil Aviation Authority

References 

Airports in Jhelum
Pakistan Army airbases